Baccharis sergiloides is a species of Baccharis known by the common name desert baccharis.

Distribution
The plant is native to the Southwestern United States and Northwestern Mexico, where it grows in wet areas in dry desert and woodland habitat, such as streambeds. It is found in the Mojave Desert and Sonoran Deserts in the States of California, Nevada, Utah, Arizona, Sonora, and Baja California.

Description
Baccharis sergiloides is a shrub producing many erect, branching stems approaching 2 m (6 ft) in maximum height.

The leaves generally fall by the time the plant blooms.

The shrub is dioecious, with male and female plants producing flower heads of different types. The head is enclosed in a layer of phyllaries which are glandular and sticky.

The fruit is a ribbed achene with a pappus a few millimeters long.

References

External links

Jepson Manual Treatment of Baccharis sergiloides

sergiloides
Flora of the California desert regions
Flora of the Sonoran Deserts
Flora of the Southwestern United States
Flora of Northwestern Mexico
Natural history of the Colorado Desert
Natural history of the Mojave Desert
Plants described in 1859
Flora without expected TNC conservation status